John Anderson (born 19 September 1879 in Rothesay, Argyll and Bute, Scotland) was a Scottish professional football centre half who played in the English Football League for Chesterfield Town.

References

Scottish footballers
Chesterfield F.C. players
English Football League players
1879 births
Year of death missing
Greenock Morton F.C. players
People from Rothesay, Bute
Association football defenders
Sportspeople from Argyll and Bute